Oldman Wood is a publicly owned forest in Kincardineshire, Scotland.

Crynoch Burn, a tributary of the River Dee, flows through the Oldman Wood.

References

Environment of Kincardine and Deeside
Forests and woodlands of Scotland